Paul Varelans (September 17, 1969 – January 16, 2021) was an American professional mixed martial artist. He competed in Ultimate Fighting Championship from 1995 to 1996, and had a worked match in Extreme Championship Wrestling in 1996.

Background
Varelans attended West Valley High School in Fairbanks, Alaska, and San Jose State University, where he played football and participated in the boxing club until 1991.

Career
Varelans made his UFC debut on July 14, 1995, at Ultimate Fighting Championship 6: Clash of the Titans, winning by KO over Cal Worsham.

On June 22, 1996, at ECW's Hardcore Heaven event, Paul Varelans faced and was choked out by ECW star Taz, in what was promoted as a "shoot fight".  Although the event was promoted as a legitimate shoot fight, Varelans agreed beforehand to lose via submission. In her 2001 autobiography Missy Hyatt, First Lady of Wrestling, Missy Hyatt claims that Varelans agreed to lose if she performed fellatio on him afterwards, but Hyatt refused saying that she did not "blow jobbers". Subsequently, Varelans allegedly became irrational and destroyed the locker room. He preceded this with two house show matches, defeating Jason Helton.

On July 29, 1997, he went to Japan for a one night appearance for Kingdom, losing a worked fight to Yoji Anjo by knockout.

Personal life and death
In December 2020, news surfaced that Varelans contracted COVID-19 during the COVID-19 pandemic in Georgia (U.S. state), was placed on mechanical ventilation and then into an induced coma. He died in Atlanta, Georgia, on January 16, 2021, aged 51.

Championships and accomplishments
International Fighting Championship
IFC Kombat in Kyiv tournament semifinalist
Ultimate Fighting Championship
UFC 7 tournament finalist
UFC 6 tournament semifinalist
UFC 8 tournament semifinalist
World Vale Tudo Championship
WVC 5 tournament semifinalist

Mixed martial arts record

|-
|Win
|align=center| 9–9
| Dick Vrij
| KO (punch)
| Rings Holland: The King of Rings
| 
|align=center| 2
|align=center| 0:30
|Amsterdam, Netherlands
|
|-
|Loss
|align=center| 8–9
| Nick Nutter
| TKO (cut)
| rowspan=2|World Vale Tudo Championship 5
| rowspan=2|
|align=center| 1
|align=center| 3:42
|rowspan=2|Recife, Brazil
|WVC 5 semi-finals.
|-
|Win
|align=center| 8–8
| Waldir dos Anjos
| TKO (submission to punches)
|align=center| 1
|align=center| 2:36
|WVC 5 quarter-finals.
|-
|Loss
|align=center| 7–8
| Carlos Barreto
| TKO (elbows and punches)
| Brazil Open '97
| 
|align=center| 1
|align=center| 2:33
|Brazil
|
|-
|Win
|align=center| 7–7
| Scott Taylor
| Submission (forearm choke)
| Extreme Challenge 6
| 
|align=center| 1
|align=center| 0:42
|Battle Creek, Michigan, United States
|
|-
|Loss
|align=center| 6–7
| Ryushi Yanagisawa
| Decision (lost points)
| Pancrase: Alive 4
| 
|align=center| 1
|align=center| 15:00
|Urayasu, Chiba, Japan
|
|-
|Loss
|align=center| 6–6
| Mark Kerr
| TKO (knees and punches)
| World Vale Tudo Championship 3
| 
|align=center| 1
|align=center| 2:06
|São Paulo, Brazil
|WVC 3 quarter-finals.
|-
|Loss
|align=center| 6–5
| Kimo Leopoldo
| TKO (corner stoppage)
| Ultimate Ultimate 1996
| 
|align=center| 1
|align=center| 9:08
|Birmingham, Alabama, United States
|Ultimate Ultimate 96 quarter-finals.
|-
|Win
|align=center| 6–4
| Shinji Katase
| TKO (submission to punches)
| U-Japan
| 
|align=center| 1
|align=center| 0:35
|Japan
|
|-
|Loss
|align=center| 5–4
| Igor Vovchanchyn
| KO (punches)
| rowspan=2|IFC 1: Kombat in Kyiv
| rowspan=2|
|align=center| 1
|align=center| 6:20
|rowspan=2|Kyiv, Ukraine
|IFC 1 semi-finals.
|-
|Win
|align=center| 5–3
| Valery Nikkolin
| TKO (corner stoppage)
|align=center| 1
|align=center| 5:12
|IFC 1 quarter-finals.
|-
|Win
|align=center| 4–3
| Joe Moreira
| Decision (unanimous)
| UFC 8
| 
|align=center| 1
|align=center| 10:00
|San Juan, Puerto Rico
|UFC 8 quarter-finals.
|-
|Loss
|align=center| 3–3
| Dan Severn
| Submission (arm-triangle choke)
| Ultimate Ultimate 1995
| 
|align=center| 1
|align=center| 1:01
|Denver, Colorado, United States
|Ultimate Ultimate 1995 quarter-finals.
|-
|Loss
|align=center| 3–2
| Marco Ruas
| TKO (leg kicks and punches)
| rowspan=3|UFC 7
| rowspan=3|
|align=center| 1
|align=center| 13:17
|rowspan=3|Buffalo, New York, United States
|UFC 7 final.
|-
|Win
|align=center| 3–1
| Mark Hall
| Submission (americana)
|align=center| 1
|align=center| 1:04
|UFC 7 semi-finals.
|-
|Win
|align=center| 2–1
| Gerry Harris
| TKO (submission to elbows)
|align=center| 1
|align=center| 1:07
|UFC 7 quarter-finals.
|-
|Loss
|align=center| 1–1
| Tank Abbott
| TKO (punches)
| rowspan=2|UFC 6
| rowspan=2|
|align=center| 1
|align=center| 1:53
|rowspan=2|Casper, Wyoming, United States
|UFC 6 semi-finals.
|-
|Win
|align=center| 1–0
| Cal Worsham
| KO (elbow)
|align=center| 1
|align=center| 1:02
|UFC 6 quarter-finals.

See also
 List of deaths due to COVID-19

References

External links

Profile at FC Fighter

1969 births
2021 deaths
American male mixed martial artists
Deaths from the COVID-19 pandemic in Georgia (U.S. state)
Mixed martial artists from California
Mixed martial artists utilizing boxing
Mixed martial artists utilizing wrestling
Sportspeople from Sunnyvale, California
Ultimate Fighting Championship male fighters